Ivan Šabjan (born 21 November 1961) is a Yugoslav-born Croatian sprint canoer who competed from 1986 to 1996. He won a complete set of medals at the ICF Canoe Sprint World Championships with a gold in 1987 (C-1 10000 m), a silver in 1986 (C-1 10000 m), and a bronze in 1986 (C-1 1000 m).

Šabjan also competed in two Summer Olympics, earning his best finish of eighth twice, both in the C-1 1000 m event (1988 for Yugoslavia, 1996 for Croatia).

References

1961 births
Canoeists at the 1988 Summer Olympics
Canoeists at the 1996 Summer Olympics
Croatian male canoeists
Living people
Olympic canoeists of Croatia
Olympic canoeists of Yugoslavia
Yugoslav male canoeists
ICF Canoe Sprint World Championships medalists in Canadian